Emilio Notte (30 January 1891 - 7 July 1982) was an Italian painter, active in a Futurist style.

Biography
Notte's parents were originally from Vicenza, but he was born in Ceglie Messapica, in the region of Apulia. From there, by 1906, he was sent to Naples to study at the Neapolitan Academy of Fine Arts, directed by Vincenzo Volpe. From there, he moved to Florence, where he worked under Adolfo De Carolis. But also encountered the elder Giovanni Fattori, and encountered the painters Giovanni Michelucci, Attilio Cavallini, Plinio Nomellini, Galileo Chini, Curzio Malaparte, Dino Campana and Ardengo Soffici.

At the age of 21 years, he exhibited at the tenth Venice Biennale. In 1913–1914, he joined common circles with futurists painters, such as Umberto Boccioni, Filippo Tommaso Marinetti, Carlo Carrà, and Aldo Palazzeschi. He joined the first World War effort, and was wounded in combat. At the beginning of 1918, Notte moved to Milan, where he often attended Margherita Sarfatti's salon of artists. In 1923 Notte won a competition at the Liceo Artistico di Venezia, in 1924, after winning a national award, he moved to Rome. He returned to Naples in 1929, and worked there the rest of his life. He donated many of his works to the town of Ceglie, housed in a Pinacoteca named after him.

References

1891 births
1982 deaths
Italian male painters
20th-century Italian painters
Italian Futurist painters
Painters from Naples
20th-century Italian male artists